Fidel Dávila Arrondo (24 April 1878 – 22 March 1962) was a Spanish Army officer during the Spanish Civil War.

Born in Barcelona, as an infantry officer, he fought in Cuba during the Spanish–American War and received the Cruz del Mérito Militar. He later entered the General Staff of the Army. He was then promoted to lieutenant colonel and assigned to Spanish Morocco. In 1929 he was promoted to brigadier general and was assigned to the VII Military district.

During the military reforms of Prime Minister Manuel Azaña, he solicited permission to go into the reserves and settled down in Burgos, from where he participated in the military conspiracy to overthrow the Popular Front government. On the night of the July 18–19, 1936 he seized the civil government of Burgos. He was a member of the Junta de Defensa Nacional and president of the Junta Técnica del Estado, the core of the future national government, as well as chief of staff of the Army. He participated in the War in the North resulting in the conquest of Biscay, Cantabria, and Asturias.

He was named minister of National Defense in the first government of Francisco Franco (February 1938), at the same time he was promoted to lieutenant general. He organized the Aragon Offensive campaign to isolate Catalonia and participated in the campaign of the Maestrazgo, the Battle of the Ebro and the Catalonia Offensive resulting in the final conquest of that region. In August 1939 he received the post of captain-general of the II Military district and the headquarters of the general staff. In July 1945 he was designated minister of the Army and in 1949 he was named head of the government. In 1951 he was part of the Council of the Kingdom and president of the Geographic Superior Council. He died in Madrid in 1962.

Notes

External links

1878 births
1962 deaths
People from Barcelona
Spanish captain generals
Spanish generals
People of the Rif War
Spanish military personnel of the Spanish Civil War (National faction)
Grandees of Spain
Prime Ministers of Spain
Defence ministers of Spain